Arthur Kraußneck (born Arthur Carl Gustav Müller; 1856–1941) was a German stage and film actor.

Selected filmography
 The Adventuress of Monte Carlo (1921)
 The Doomed (1924)
 My Leopold (1924)
 Chronicles of the Gray House (1925)
 The Mill at Sanssouci (1926)
 The Blue Danube (1926)
 Prinz Louis Ferdinand (1927)
 Dancing Vienna (1927)
 The Girl with the Five Zeros (1927)
 The Weavers (1927)
 Luther (1928)

Bibliography
 Wipfler, Esther. Martin Luther in Motion Pictures: History of a Metamorphosis. Vandenhoeck & Ruprecht, 2011.

External links

1856 births
1941 deaths
German male film actors
German male silent film actors
German male stage actors
People from the Province of Prussia
20th-century German male actors